Brett Stapleton (born 7 May 1987) is a rugby union player who played for the Western Force in the Super 14 in 2007. Frustrated by the lack of opportunity in Perth due to their plethora of quality backline players, he has taken up a contract with the Queensland Reds for 2008 and is currently playing for the East Coast Aces in the Australian Rugby Championship in its inaugural year. He is the brother of Austrialian National Rugby League player Nathan Stapleton

He plays on the wing and is known for his fast pace. He has a personal best for the 100m sprint of 10.2s In the Queensland GPS athletics championships in 2005 he ran 10.69 (with the record being 10.68) but pulled his hamstring 5m from the finish line and dived over instead

References

1987 births
Living people
Australian rugby union players
Australian expatriate rugby union players
Expatriate rugby union players in Japan
Australian expatriate sportspeople in Japan
Western Force players
Coca-Cola Red Sparks players
Expatriate rugby union players in Italy
Rugby union wings